"One Margarita" is a song recorded by American country music singer Luke Bryan. It is the third single from his seventh studio album Born Here Live Here Die Here. Bryan's bandleader Michael Carter wrote the song with Josh Thompson and Matt Dragstrem.

The song peaked at number 19 on the US Billboard Hot 100, making it Bryan's first Top 20 in the United States since his 2014 hit "Play It Again", which peaked at number 14. “One Margarita” was certified “2x Platinum” by the RIAA on February 24th 2023.

Content and history
Wendy Hermanson of the blog Taste of Country wrote of the song that it is a "light, sparkling, feel-good number dedicated to a bit of old-fashioned hedonism that has Bryan counting 'One margarita, two margarita, three margarita, we'll be gone,' and name-dropping Bob Marley, Jimmy Buffett, and Kenny Chesney. A mariachi band helps the vibe along, and everyone has plenty of smiles to spare. Jon Freeman of Rolling Stone Country wrote that the song has an "equally buoyant melody and groove that’s punctuated by mandolin and peals of Hammond organ. Bryan, who’s no stranger to a party song, looks at the bigger picture of vacation as escape from the stress and anxiety of everyday existence." Bryan's bandleader, Michael Carter, wrote the song with Josh Thompson and Matt Dragstrem. The song was officially released to radio on April 13, 2020. It is the album's third single, following "Knockin' Boots" and "What She Wants Tonight".

Critical reception
"One Margarita" was included on a list of the worst songs of 2020 published by Variety; the song was described as an "[ode] to alcohol abuse" and the "wrong song at the wrong time" in light of the ongoing COVID-19 pandemic.

Music video
The song's music video was directed by Michael Monaco. It features Bryan "cavorting on the beach". Bryan's wife, Caroline, and mother, LeClaire, make guest appearances, as do Caylee Hammack and members of Old Dominion. Bryan filmed the video during Crash My Playa, an annual beach party he holds in Mexico, in January 2020 prior to the song's release.

Chart performance

Weekly charts

Year-end charts

Certifications

References

2020 songs
2020 singles
Capitol Records Nashville singles
Luke Bryan songs
Songs about alcohol
Songs written by Michael Carter (musician)
Songs written by Josh Thompson (singer)
Songs written by Matt Dragstrem